This is a list of justices of the Supreme Court of Iceland.

List

External links
Justices (official website)
Former justices (official website)

Supreme Court justices
Iceland